Parakrami is an unreleased Indian Hindi-language film directed by Vijay Deep, starring Nutan, Mithun Chakraborty, Sangeeta Bijlani, Kader Khan, Kiran Kumar, Charan Raj, Sharat Saxena, Satish Shah, Tiku Talsania and Alok Nath.

Plot

Parakrami is an action thriller, featuring Nutan, Mithun Chakraborty, Sangeeta Bijlani, Kader Khan, Kiran Kumar and Charan Raj. The film was supposed to get released in 1991, but to date remains unreleased. Promos from the film were seen on television at the time it was supposed to release. Actress Nutan died in February 1991 and this was the last film she worked on before her death.

Summary

Parakrami is the story of a mother and her son, played by Nutan and Mithun Chakraborty respectively. Mithun's love interest is Sangeeta Bijlani. Mother has a dream and she hopes her son to fulfill the same, but some evil minds already has other ideas. Whether the son is able to fulfill his mother's dream, form the climax.

Cast

Nutan
Mithun Chakraborty
Sangeeta Bijlani
Kader Khan
Kiran Kumar
Charan Raj
Sharat Saxena
Satish Shah
Tiku Talsania
Alok Nath
Kunika

Music
"Gunahon Ki" - Amit Kumar, Kavita Krishnamurthy
"Jab Tunew Kehdi Ha" - Amit Kumar, Alka Yagnik
"Neta Ki Sawari Hai" - Amit Kumar, Kavita Krishnamurthy
"O Janiya" - Amit Kumar, Alisha Chinoy

References

1991 films
1990s Hindi-language films
Indian action films
Unreleased Hindi-language films
Films scored by Laxmikant–Pyarelal